Novo is the name of several rural localities in Russia:
Novo, Tver Oblast, a village in Tver Oblast, Russia
Novo, Vladimir Oblast, a village in Vladimir Oblast, Russia
Novo, name of several other rural localities in Russia